The Mimamsa Sutra or the Purva Mimamsa Sutras (ca. 300–200 BCE), written by Rishi Jaimini is one of the most important ancient Hindu philosophical texts. It forms the basis of Mimamsa, the earliest of the six orthodox schools (darshanas) of Indian philosophy. According  to tradition, sage Jaimini was one of the disciples of sage Veda Vyasa, the author of the Mahabharata.

Overview
The work is divided into twelve adhyayas (chapters), which are further divided into sixty padas (sections).

The text provides rules for the interpretation of the Vedas and also provides philosophical justifications for the observance of Vedic rituals, by offering meaning and significance of Vedic rituals to attain Moksha.

Commentaries
Over the centuries many commentaries were written on this text, most important being the Śabara Bhāṣya written by Śābara, the only extant commentary on all the 12 chapters of the Mimamsa Sutras of Jaimini.
 The  major commentaries written on the text as well as the Śabara Bhāṣya were by Kumarila Bhatta and Prabhakara Mishra.

Philosophy
Jaimini, in his Mimamsa Sutra, presents material activity and its results as the whole of reality (vipanam rtam). He and later proponents of Karma-mimamsa philosophy teach that material existence is endless, that there is no liberation. For Mimamsas, the cycle of karma is perpetual, and the best one can aim for is higher birth among the Devas. Therefore, they hold that the whole purpose of the Vedas is to engage human beings in rituals for creating good karma, and consequently the mature soul's prime responsibility is to ascertain the exact meaning of the Vedas' sacrificial injunctions and to execute them.

Content
Mimamsa Sutra consists of twelve chapters:

 In the first chapter import of the collections of words which have various meanings is discussed. Such as, injunction (vidhi), explanatory passage (arthavada), hymn (mantra), tradition (smriti) etc. 
 In the second chapter, discussions relating to the difference of various rites, refutation of erroneously proofs etc. are held. 
 In the third chapter, sruti, sense of the passage (linga), context (vakya), and their respective weight when in apparent opposition to one another, the ceremonies called pratipatti-karmdni, things mentioned incidentally (anarabhyadhita) and the duties of the sacrifices are expounded. 
 In the fourth chapter, the influence on other rites of the principal and subordinate rites, the fruit caused by the juhu and dice-playing, which forms a subordinate part of the rajasuya sacrifice are explained. 
 Fifth chapter discusses relative order of various passages of sruti, different parts of sacrifice etc. 
 In the sixth chapter, the persons qualified to offer sacrifices, their obligations, the substitutes for materials used in sacrifices, expiatory rites and the different sacrificial fires are made clear. 
 In the seventh and eight chapters, transference of ceremonies and transference by virtue from one sacrifice to another are discussed. 
 In the ninth chapter, adaptation of hymns when quoted in a new context (uha), and melodies(samans) and mantras are discussed. 
 In the tenth, the discussion revolves around the non-performance of the primary rites and dependent rites, offerings to grahas etc.
 In the eleventh chapter, there is discussion on tantra (combining several acts one), and avapa (performance of an act more than once). 
 In the twelfth chapter, prasanga, tantra and cumulation of concurrent rites (samuchchaya) is explained.

References

External links
 Mimamsa Sutras Of Jaimini, translated by Mohan Lal Sandal
 Full Text of the Mimamsa Sutra, on archive.org

Ancient Indian literature
Indian philosophy
Sutras (Hinduism)
3rd-century BC works